Birgerbohlinia is an extinct genus of Giraffidae. It was first named by Crusafont Pairó and Villalta in 1951 and was found in Crevillente-2 (Alicante, Spain).

References

External links 
 Birgerbohlinia at the Paleobiology Database

Prehistoric giraffes
Prehistoric even-toed ungulate genera
Miocene mammals of Europe
Prehistoric monotypic mammal genera